Devarakonda Vittal Rao College of Engineering and Technology (DVRCET) is an engineering college affiliated with Jawaharlal Nehru Technological University, Hyderabad. It functions under the Devarakonda Educational Society.

History
It was established in 1997 at the Madhapur campus (currently the MBA campus). In year 2001, it was shifted to Kashipur Village near Sangareddy. The chairman of the college, Devarakonda Vittal Rao, was a member of the 14th Lok Sabha of India. He represented the Mahabubnagar constituency of Andhra Pradesh and is a member of the Indian National Congress (INC) political party.

Devarakonda Educational Society
The Devarakonda Educational Society was established in 1994 as a non-profit organization. Sri D.Vittal Rao  is the president of the society. In servicing the objective, the Devarakonda Educational Society established the D.V.R.College of Engineering and Technology in 1996, the D.V.R. Post Graduate College of Management Studies in the year 1997, offering academic programmes in Engineering, Technology, Management and MTech.

Courses and Facilities
The college Library has a collection of 21000 volumes, and 3500 titles, eight news papers and other professional periodicals. The library has a book bank for SC and ST students. Books for SC and St students are given free for certain period by the Social Welfare Department of the government of Andhra Pradesh as per the Government’s policy. Select articles from the periodicals are bound and there are 2000 such bound volumes.
The college offers courses in seven disciplines which are Electronics and Communications Engineering, Electrical and Electronics Engineering, Mechanical Engineering, Computer Science Engineering, Civil Engineering in it including MBA and MTech in VLSI Design & Embedded systems and MTech in Computer Science Engineering. The college does not offer any hostel facility but provides transportation facilities to its students. There are 16 college buses connecting to the city.

Technical and cultural events
Co-circular activities include basketball, volleyball and cricket grounds inside the campus. Inter-college competitions are held regularly. Technical events like: "Aktzin", conducted by Electrical department; "Elektra", conducted by Electronics department, and "Xyno minds" conducted by Computer science department are national event held annually. There is a college annual cultural festival Dhoom organized by its students, mostly.

National Cadet Corps @ DVR College
The college has its association with the Indian Army's NCC wing to train students through CATC camps inside campus and even produce the potential cadets to attend national level NCC camps. NCC in the college is under the command of 33 Telangana Battalion of Indian Army headquartered at Sangareddi, Telangana.

Image gallery

References

External links 

 
 
 xynomindz official website 
 

Engineering colleges in Telangana
All India Council for Technical Education
1997 establishments in Andhra Pradesh
Educational institutions established in 1997